Melilotus wolgicus, the Volga sweet-clover or Russian melilot, is native to Russia and Kazakhstan, where it is common in the lower Volga and Don valleys. The species is also naturalized in Manitoba and Saskatchewan, where the climate is similar to that of its native range. The plant has been discussed as a potential forage crop, as it is tolerant to cold and to drought, and reportedly more productive than M. albus.

Melilotus wolgicus is a biennial herb with a large taproot. Leaves are trifoliate with ovate to lanceolate leaflets.

References

Trifolieae
Flora of Russia
Flora of Kazakhstan
Flora of Manitoba
Flora of Saskatchewan
Flora without expected TNC conservation status